Jeffrey Michael German (August 23, 1953 – September 3, 2022) was an American investigative reporter. His journalistic career in Las Vegas spanned four decades. He wrote for the Las Vegas Review-Journal and the Las Vegas Sun. He was stabbed to death in 2022. Elected official Robert Telles, whom German had investigated and reported on, is accused of his murder.

Early life and education 
German was a native of Milwaukee, Wisconsin. He earned a master's degree from Marquette University. He began his journalistic career as an intern for the Milwaukee Journal Sentinel. He also worked with Jim Romenesko.

Career 
German was a columnist and investigative reporter at the Las Vegas Sun for more than two decades, covering organized crime, government, politics, and courts. He covered the MGM Grand fire in 1980 and the early 2000s FBI investigation into bribes taken by Clark County commissioners (Operation G-Sting). With fellow reporter Cathy Scott, he broke the story of the 1997 murder of mafia associate bookmaker Herbert Blitzstein. 

In 2001, German wrote the true crime book Murder in Sin City: The Death of a Las Vegas Casino Boss, which told the story of the death of Ted Binion, heir to the Binion's Horseshoe fortune. German was a writer and host for the podcast series Mobbed Up: The Fight for Las Vegas which was co-produced with the Mob Museum.

After being laid off by the Las Vegas Sun in 2009, German joined the Las Vegas Review-Journal newspaper staff in 2010.

In the aftermath of the 2017 Las Vegas shooting, German was the first to report that the shooter had initially fired at two nearby jet fuel tanks at the Las Vegas airport before turning his attention to the music festival site. He also reported on failures in the city's inspections ahead of the fatal 2019 Alpine Motel Apartments fire, and investigated mismanagement, unlawful misconduct, and bullying in the office of the Clark County Public Administrator, Robert Telles.

Death 
German was found stabbed to death outside his Las Vegas Valley home on September 4, 2022. He was 69 years old. The police reported that he had been involved in an altercation with somebody outside his house the day before he was found dead and that they had identified a suspect for his murder. 

On September 7, police arrested Clark County public administrator Robert Telles on suspicion of German's murder. Telles had lost his re-election bid in the Democratic primary after German published the results of an investigation into allegations that Telles was contributing to a hostile work environment and was involved in an inappropriate relationship with a staffer.

References 

1953 births
2022 deaths
American newspaper reporters and correspondents
American investigative journalists
Murdered American journalists
Journalists from Las Vegas
American columnists
American male journalists
20th-century American journalists
21st-century American journalists
20th-century American male writers
21st-century American male writers
Marquette University alumni
People murdered in Nevada
Deaths by stabbing in Nevada
Date of birth missing
Place of birth missing